If the Shoe Fits (also known as Stroke of Midnight) is a 1990 American television film, starring Rob Lowe and Jennifer Grey. It was directed by Tom Clegg.

Plot
In Paris, Kelly Carter (Jennifer Grey) is trying to develop her career as a shoe designer. Lost in Paris, Wanda the fairy (Andrea Ferreol) tries very hard to get directions on a crowded boulevard and nobody gives her attention but the sensible Kelly. Kelly goes to meet with famous fashion designer Francesco Salvitore (Rob Lowe), but is late for the appointment with him, and is turned away. Wanda meets Kelly again, and gives her advice, trying to instill confidence in her and help her succeed. Using a pretense, Wanda knocks on the door of Salvitore, who is floundering and looking for a 'new face' for his fashion house. She subtly suggests that he host a great ball at his residence, insisting that everything he needs is closer than he thinks. Wanda then imparts magical power to a pair of shoes Kelly has designed, that transform her into a stunning beauty. Attending the ball with friends, she attracts the attention of all the guests, and the smitten Salvitore; she is overwhelmed and flees, but he eventually tracks her down, and proclaims her his new diva.

Cast
 Rob Lowe as Francesco Salvitore
 Jennifer Grey as Kelly Carter/Prudence
 Élisabeth Vitali as Véronique
 Andréa Ferréol as Wanda
 Rebecca Potok as Mimi Larcher
 Sacha Briquet as Cirage
 Florence Pelly as Taffy
 Alison Hornus as Domino
 Josephine Penedo as Carol
 Fabienne Chaudat as Receptionist

Reception
Movie review website Moria gave the a movie a very bad review, stating: "It is all directed with a giddy silliness. Most of the cast overact at the level of cartoonish farce. Rob Lowe is a particular offender, deliberately giving a vain and preening performance."

References

External links
 
 
 

1990 films
1990s English-language films
American television films
Films based on Cinderella
Films directed by Tom Clegg (director)